Henriette-Hélène de Beauvoir (6 June 1910 – 1 July 2001) was a French painter. She was the younger sister of philosopher Simone de Beauvoir. Her art was exhibited in Europe, Japan, and the US. She married Lionel de Roulet.

When Hélène de Beauvoir lived in Goxwiller, a village near Strasbourg, she became president of the center for battered women. She continued painting until she was 85. Her paintings were related to feminist philosophy and women's issues.

References

Sources 
 Monteil Claudine, Les Sœurs Beauvoir, Editions no 1, Paris, 2003.

External links 

Hélène de Beauvoir site

1910 births
2001 deaths
Artists from Paris
Burials at Père Lachaise Cemetery
French feminists
French women painters
French women's rights activists
Simone de Beauvoir
20th-century French women artists
Signatories of the 1971 Manifesto of the 343